{{Infobox lighthouse
| name            = Thunder Bay Island
| image           = Thunderbayisland.jpg
| caption         = Thunder Bay Island Light undated USCG
| location        = Alpena County, Michigan
| coordinates     = 
| yearbuilt       = 1857 (station established 1831)
| yearlit         = 1857
| automated       = 1983
| yeardeactivated =
| foundation      = Dressed stone and timber
| construction    = Limestone
| shape           = Frustum of a cone with attached keeper's residence
| marking         = White with red lantern
| height          = 
| focalheight     = 
| lens            = Fourth-order Fresnel lens
| currentlens     = 
| intensity       = 
| range           = 16
| characteristic  = FI G 10s
| admiralty       = 
| module          =  
}}Thunder Bay Island Light''', located on Thunder Bay Island's southeast tip, is one of the oldest operating lighthouses in Michigan. The third operating U.S. lighthouse in Lake Huron was built here in 1831, but it disintegrated almost at once and was rebuilt in 1832 of local limestone. A fourth order Fresnel lens was installed.

A fog bell was installed in 1858, and the lightkeeper's house was rebuilt in 1868.  A steam-powered fog horn was added in 1871, and a fog signal building sheltering the fog signal apparatus was constructed in 1892.

The lighthouse was staffed during the seasons of Great Lakes navigation from 1832 until the staff was replaced by automation in 1983, more than 150 years later.

Current status
The Thunder Bay Island Light was automated in 1983.  The lighthouse was added to the National Register of Historic Places on August 19, 1984; however, the lighthouse and adjoining infrastructure resources have deteriorated since automation.  In 1997 the United States Coast Guard leased Thunder Bay Island Light to the Thunder Bay Island Preservation Society'' (TBILPS).

Under TBILPS's guidance, the light has been the object of an intense rescue effort.  They have been the subject of a feature article in Lighthouse Digest.

In 2004, Stephen B. Tongue and TBILPS published a book on Thunder Bay Island's history and heritage, with proceeds assigned to the historic preservation of the island.

Notes

References
Stephen D. Tongue, "Lanterns & Lifeboats: A History of Thunder Bay Island" (Alpena, Mich.; Serge Publications, 2004).

External links

 Lighthouse Central,  Photographs, History, Directions and Way points for Thunder Bay Island Lighthouse, The Ultimate Guide to East Michigan Lighthouses by Jerry Roach (Publisher: Bugs Publishing LLC - July 2006). ; .
 
 Thunder Bay Island Light, Terry Pepper, Seeing the Light.
 

Lighthouses completed in 1832
Lighthouses completed in 1857
Houses completed in 1857
Lighthouses on the National Register of Historic Places in Michigan
Buildings and structures in Alpena County, Michigan
National Register of Historic Places in Alpena County, Michigan
1832 establishments in Michigan Territory